Soe Myat Thu (born 10 October 1989) is a footballer from Burma, and a striker for Myanmar national football team.
He currently plays for Zeyar Shwe Myay FC in Myanmar National League.

References

1989 births
Living people
Burmese footballers
Myanmar international footballers
Association football forwards
Southern Myanmar F.C. players